{{DISPLAYTITLE:C13H8O2}} 
The molecular formula C13H8O2 (molar mass: 196.20 g/mol, exact mass: 196.0524 u) may refer to:

 Fluorone
 Xanthone

Molecular formulas